Sophie McDonnell (born 3 February 1976) is an English television/radio presenter and former singer. She was a member of the group Precious, the UK entry for the Eurovision Song Contest in 1999 at which they placed 12th. She later presented children's television for CBBC until 2006.

Biography
Sophie McDonnell was born in Preston, Lancashire and worked as a model and actress before joining girl band Precious. She has acted in Emmerdale, which is a British soap opera.

She presented in-vision links on the CBBC channel up until summer 2006, and presented The Big Toe Radio Show on BBC7 from 2006 to 2009. She presented the final series of 50/50 on CBBC and co-hosted the channel's coverage of Comic Relief Does Fame Academy in 2005.

In 2007, McDonnell starred in a production of Snow White and the Seven Dwarfs at the Kings Theatre, Southsea.

Filmography

References

External links
 

1976 births
Living people
English radio presenters
English television presenters
British women television presenters
Eurovision Song Contest entrants for the United Kingdom
Eurovision Song Contest entrants of 1999
Musicians from Preston, Lancashire
Precious (band) members
21st-century English women singers
21st-century English singers
British women radio presenters
Mass media people from Preston, Lancashire